Diemenia may refer to:
 Diemenia Korth., a synonym for Parastemon, a genus of plant in the family Chrysobalanaceae
 Diemenia (bug), a genus of shield bugs in the tribe Diemeniini
 An alternate and obsolete orthographical variant of Demansia, a genus of Australian snake.